Steven Jay Russell (born December 31, 1957) is an American con artist, known for escaping from prison multiple times. I Love You Phillip Morris, a film about his life and crimes, was produced in 2009. In 2011, his crimes were featured on the television series I Almost Got Away with It, in the episode "Got A Boyfriend to Support". He was also the subject of "On The Run", a 2005 episode of The Discovery Channel series King of Cons.

Biography
Russell was adopted in 1957 after his birth parents divorced. He was adopted by Georgia and David Russell, whose family owned a produce business. At the age of 18 he began working for the family business, and also volunteered as a reserve sheriff's deputy and played organ for his church. In 1976 he married Debbie Davis, daughter of the police chief's secretary, and their daughter, Stephanie, was born two years later. Russell and his wife divorced after he revealed to her that he was homosexual.

On 20th of March, 1998, Russell posed as a millionaire from Virginia in an attempt to legitimise a $75,000 loan from NationsBank in Dallas; when bank officials became suspicious and alerted the police, Russell feigned a heart attack and was transported to the hospital. Russell was placed on security watch, but he impersonated an FBI agent and called the hospital on his mobile telephone to tell them he could be released.

U.S. Marshals later tracked Russell to Florida, where they arrested him on April 5, 1998, when he went to retrieve a fax. Russell was sentenced to a total of 144 years in prison (99 years for the escapes and 45 years for subsequent scams).

As of 2010, Russell is in the Allan B. Polunsky Unit on a 23-hour lockup, only having one free hour a day to shower and exercise. He was previously held in the Mark W. Michael Unit and the W.J. Estelle Unit. His maximum sentence date is March 13, 2113, and he became eligible for parole on December 15, 2020.

On February 7, 2023, Russell was granted parole. His release date is still pending.

In media

Film
A film about his life and crimes was produced in 2009, named I Love You Phillip Morris, starring Jim Carrey as Russell and Ewan McGregor as his boyfriend Phillip Morris.

Internet and print media
Since the movie went into production and Russell's story became more popular, several articles appeared in print and online uncovering lesser known details of his exploits. Esquire magazine interviewed both Russell and Morris for its feature, "The Great Escapee", while The Guardian published "I Love You, Phillip Morris: A Conman's Story".

Sources

References

1957 births
20th-century American criminals
American adoptees
American confidence tricksters
American deputy sheriffs
American escapees
Impostors
American gay men
Place of birth missing (living people)
LGBT people from North Carolina
Living people
People from Elizabeth City, North Carolina
People from Virginia Beach, Virginia
Prisoners and detainees of Texas